The Birmingham Ladywood by-election, in Birmingham, on 26 June 1969 was held after Labour Member of Parliament (MP) Victor Yates died on 19 January the same year. Although the seat had been Labour-held since 1945 it was captured by the Liberals in a defeat for Harold Wilson's government.

Campaign
In Doris Fisher, Dr. Louis Glass and Wallace Lawler the three major parties all picked candidates who were members of the local council. Lawler, however, had a strong reputation for campaigning in the area, having previously used issues raised by the television drama Cathy Come Home (1966) to highlight poverty in the area, organised a petition to protest against increases in electricity prices and arranged a protest demonstration of mainly Birmingham pensioners to travel to London to hand in letters and petitions at 10 Downing Street. As a consequence, the popular local activist ensured the first Liberal Party MP for a Birmingham constituency in 80 years.

Colin Jordan ran as a candidate for the far right British Movement and, with Ray Hill as his election agent, their campaign, in which their literature attacked Jews and immigrants and proclaimed loyalty to Nazism, led to some violent scuffles with opponents. Although Jordan finished a distant fourth the result was frequently cited by those who advocated Nazi orthodoxy on the far right as the British Movement won 282 votes (3% share), despite openly wearing swastika insignia and featuring Adolf Hitler's image on their literature.

A candidate for the anti-nuclear energy Fellowship Party also contested the by-election.

Results

References

Birmingham Ladywood by-election
Ladywood, 1969
Birmingham Ladywood by-election
Ladywood by-election, 1969
Far-right politics in England
Birmingham Ladywood by-election